Wonderama is a children's television program that originally appeared on the Metromedia-owned stations from 1955 to 1977. The show was revived from 1980 to 1987, and again in 2016.

Hosts
Al Hodge (as Captain Video 1955–1956)
Jon Gnagy (mid–late 1950s)
Sandy Becker (1955–56)
Chuck McCann (1955–56)
Pat Meikle (co-hosting 1955–1956)
Herb Sheldon (1956–1958)
Bill Britten (co-host in 1958; later known as New York's Bozo the Clown)
Doris Faye (co-host in 1958)
Sonny Fox (1959–1967)
Bob McAllister (1967–1977)
various teenagers (1980–1987)
David Osmond (2017–present)

Original series
Wonderama aired on its originating station, WNEW-TV in New York City, as well as in five other markets in which Metromedia owned television stations: WTTG in Washington D.C., KMBC-TV in Kansas City, KTTV in Los Angeles, WXIX-TV in Cincinnati, and WTCN-TV in Minneapolis – Saint Paul. The show was three hours long for most of its run on Sunday mornings. The show was created as well as originally hosted by actor-comedian Sandy Becker, who became a New York children's program star in his own right.

In the 1960s, flingorama aired in a one-hour weekday version in addition to the three-hour Sunday show. The one-hour program lasted until 1970.

The show scaled back to two hours in 1977 before WNEW canceled it in December of that year. The last produced show was taped December 21 before airing on December 25. In an interview on WNEW's local talk show Midday with Bill Boggs on the day of Wonderama'''s cancellation, host Bob McAllister claimed to have no idea why the show ended. However, in a 1993 interview with the Pennsylvania newspaper The Morning Call, McAllister stated that an advertisement that he bought in The New York Times telling viewers to stop watching Wonderama might have led to the program's cancellation. McAllister bought the Times ad after he became upset when an ad for the 1972 Charles Bronson movie The Mechanic aired during the show. "When I was doing Wonderama," McAllister said, "I always made sure that there was never any violence within the framework of the show. They claimed that the ads were computer programmed, but I didn't buy it. I took out a full-page $10,000 ad in The New York Times warning parents not to let their children watch the show. Unfortunately, I bummed myself out of broadcasting permanently with that little faux pas, but I still stand by it."

After its cancellation, Wonderama continued in two-hour Sunday morning reruns from January 1978 to June 1980. McAllister reportedly was unhappy with edits to the reruns, which usually eliminated celebrity performances in order to avoid having to pay royalties.

The Sonny Fox years

Independent television network Metromedia (born from the former DuMont Network) hired Fox to host Wonderama on its New York flagship station, WABD (soon to become WNEW-TV), succeeding the team of Bill Britten and Doris Faye. Hiring Fox ended what some called the "musical-hosts syndrome" that Wonderama had for its first few years. Fox became Wonderamas sole host for eight years, until August 1967.

Suave, witty, and congenial, Fox juggled the slapstick and the serious, turning the marathon Wonderama (during Fox's tenure the show ran four hours Sunday mornings) into a weekly academy at which anything could happen and often did; whether Shakespearean dramatizations, guest celebrities, magic demonstrations (customarily by legendary magician James "The Amazing" Randi), art instruction, spelling bees, learning games, or other elements.

Fox was deft at turning a potential haphazard hodgepodge into a seamless whole, and he was consistent in never talking down to his young guests or viewers, treating them with legitimate respect and tolerance. The result was that Wonderama was rarely if ever known to have bored either the children who appeared on the show (the segments showing the weekly 25 or 30 children waving cross-armed, leading in and out of commercial breaks, were as much a signature as Fox himself) or those who watched it.

For a few years it seemed Fox owned children's weekend television in the New York metropolitan area. In the same year he joined Wonderama, he reached back to the "color war" team competitions he knew as a child in summer camp to create and host Just For Fun, a two-and-a-half hour Saturday morning show involving two teams of kids in blue and gold jumpsuits to compete in contests ranging from the mildly athletic to the wildly bizarre. One mainstay was the Treasure Chest competition where one contestant from each team would be placed in front of a locked chest and 1,000 keys. When the winner found the key to open his or her chest, a siren would sound, and whatever was happening at the time (be it cartoon, commercial, skit, or whatever else) was interrupted. The winner would stand with arms outstretched and a towering pile of board games and toys would be placed in his or her arms.

During this time, Fox made countless personal appearances throughout the New York metropolitan area. The Wonderama show was featured at the Hollywood Arena at the Freedomland U.S.A. theme park in The Bronx. Several shows at Freedomland were filmed and broadcast on the following Sunday mornings. Fox' memories about his appearances at the theme park are captured in Freedomland U.S.A.: The Definitive History (Theme Park Press, 2019).

Fox also hosted ABC's first original Saturday morning program, On Your Mark, a game show in which children ages 9 through 13 answered questions about various professions. On Your Mark lasted one season, but the lively Just For Fun lasted until 1965.

Fox has since become an Emmy award-winning producer of his Broadway Songwriters Series, has his own website, and has a "Wonderama with Sonny Fox" Facebook group hosted by Randy Bucknoff, who is both administrator of the group and of Fox's website.

Fox (at 90 years of age) met with President Obama in Washington, D.C. at a 2015 event in the Israeli Embassy. He died on January 24, 2021, of COVID-19-related pneumonia, at the age of 95.

The Bob McAllister years
Following the frequent turnover of hosts throughout the 1950s, Wonderama experienced its greatest viewership by way of one-time Baltimore kids' show host Bob McAllister, who replaced Sonny Fox as host in 1967 and remained in that role until 1977. Each show's taping included (but was not necessarily limited to) education, music, audience participation, games, interviews, and cartoon shorts.

The program aired for three hours, including several breaks to allow for cartoon insertions. On most of Metromedia's stations, these would be Warner Bros. cartoons from the 1940s and 1950s. On KMBC in Kansas City, an ABC affiliate, the show only ran two hours without the cartoon inserts (since this station did not own broadcast rights to cartoon shorts).

The program's closing theme song, sung by McAllister, was called "Kids Are People Too", which was later adapted as the show's title when ABC picked it up as a Sunday morning kids show. The song was also featured on an album of music from Wonderama by McAllister called Oh, Gee, it's Great to be a Kid.

Features
Popular features of Wonderama during the McAllister years included the following:"Snake Cans": the classic game in which Bob would pick kids from the audience one by one to open one of ten cans, nine of which were filled with spring-loaded "snakes". The tenth one contained an artificial flower bouquet, which earned the holder the grand prize (usually a Ross Apollo bicycle), along with other prizes for answering trivia questions."Wonderama A Go-Go" (later called "Disco City", and currently known as "Dance Emergency"): a dance contest similar in style to American Bandstand, in which the best dancer won a prize. After it was renamed "Disco City", each contestant did his or her own dance to the same record; the record was introduced at the beginning of the segment by The Disco Kid, a boy dressed in a costume reminiscent of The Lone Ranger. Originally, The Disco Kid's theme was a loop of the chorus from The Raspberries' "Overnight Sensation", but this was later replaced with the song "Ride On, Disco Kid"."Does Anybody Here Have an Aardvark?": a song which Bob sang before a segment asking members of the audience to produce unusual objects for prizes. This usually occurred at the beginning of the show."Exercise, Exercise!": this most often included jumping jacks and three-way burpees, involving all the kids in the audience. The segment had its own theme song:
Exercise, exercise!
Come on everybody do your exercise!
Exercise, exercise!
Come on everybody do your exercise!"Good News": audience members were selected to read "good" news items from around the country before McAllister sang a song:
Have you heard any good news today, today?
I wanna hear what you have to say,
wait till I get to the count of three,
and tell me all the good news you have for me, one-two-three!
After singing, Bob would ask audience members for their own good news."Guess Your Best": a game show segment in which three contestants made predictions of the outcome of audience polls and relay races. McAllister hosted the game, using the pseudonym Bert Beautiful."Eye Spy" (aka "Disguise Delimit"):  A masquerade game, in which five pre-selected kids, all pretending to be the same person and all wearing the same type of costume, were ushered on stage, and an audience member was selected to figure out which one was the actual person."Whose is Whose is Whose": contestants were introduced to four children and four adults, and had to guess which adult was which child's father. To help, the children and parents were sometimes asked to do things such as jump up in the air (ostensibly because a child and his parent might jump in a similar style). McAllister adopted a silly pseudonym for this segment as well, calling himself either Chuck Chuckles or Chuck Roast."Head Of The House"': selected kids took part in a series of quirky competitions, including gerbil races, balloon-breaking contests, and so forth. The child who won the most events or scored the most points was crowned the Head of the House.

Parting gifts
Each week, audience members received a package of parting gifts as detailed on the show, containing varying items, including the following:
A Lactona toothbrush
An issue of Dynamite Magazine or Golden MagazineA supply of Good Humor ice cream
A box of Hostess Twinkies
A 6-pack of RC Cola
A Goo Goo Cluster candy bar
A tube of Hold! cough lozenges
A package of Fruit Stripe Gum
A gift certificate for Burger King or McDonald's
Nandy Candy, a chocolate bar containing fruit (McAllister would stretch out the pronunciation, i.e., "Naaaandy Caaaaandy")
A pack of Lender's Bagelettes; each child also got a necklace made from a real, shellacked Lenders Bagelette, which had either their name or their last initial painted on it
A 45 rpm record of one of the music artists who had performed on the Wonderama episode that week
Harvey Comics comic books

Guests

Top stars from all genres of entertainment (music, movies, television, etc.) made appearances on New York-based Wonderama, including the following: 

Southside Johnny and the Asbury Jukes
The Sylvers
ABBA
Jerry Lewis
Jodie Foster
Van Halen
Neil Sedaka
Roger Daltrey
David Cassidy
Muhammad Ali and Joe Frazier: in a build-up to their rematch bout, Ali and Frazier appeared in January 1974, competing in a game of marbles.
José Feliciano
The Jackson 5
Monty Python
The Amazing Randi
DeForest Kelley
Leif Garrett
Soupy Sales
Billy Crystal
Wolfman Jack
Lena Zavaroni
Eddie Money
Evel Knievel
The Bay City Rollers
Ann B. Davis
Rosey Grier
Doug Henning
Gladys Knight & The Pips
Grandmaster Flash and the Furious Five
Melba Moore
Don McLean
Richard Rodgers
Maria Von Trapp
Marvin Hamlisch
Penny Marshall
Cindy Williams
Will Geer
Tracy Austin
Johnny Bench
Reggie Jackson
Walt Frazier
Don Newcombe
the cast of AnnieScott Baio
Donovan
Eddie Kendricks
Van McCoy
Tavares
Kenny Rankin
Abraham Beame
Sam Savitt
Lee Salk
Henry Heimlich
David Essex
The Hues Corporation
Joanne Worley
Joe Raposo
Jacques Cousteau
Sister Sledge
Paul Williams
Burt Bacharach
Melissa Manchester
Kiki Dee
Billy Preston
Ray Stevens
Bob Keeshan
Harry Chapin
Pearl Bailey
Dick Van Dyke
The cast of Grease
The Muppets
Jim Henson
Tim Moore
Rodney Dangerfield
George Barris
Al Flosso
Ann Reinking
Dick Clark
Don Most
Colonel Sanders
Mark Wilson
Arthur Ashe
Billie Jean King
Ringling Bros. and Barnum & Bailey Circus
Marcel Marceau
Vanilla Fudge
Kool & the Gang
Elton John
Kiss
Dolenz, Jones, Boyce & Hart

1980 revival
Beginning in 1980, a documentary magazine show for children, hosted by teens, ran on Sunday mornings on WNEW-TV. While this show retained the Wonderama title, it bore no resemblance to the original. This hour-long incarnation ran until 1983; reruns edited to 30 minutes aired from 1984 to 1986 on WNEW-TV/WNYW on Saturday mornings. Hosts included Pam Potillo and J.D. Roth. Guests included Rick Schroeder and the Sugarhill Gang.

2017 revival
A new version of Wonderama, hosted by David Osmond (son of Alan Osmond), debuted on WPIX-TV in New York with "A Wonderama Christmas" special on December 25, 2016, followed by a national rollout on Tribune Broadcasting stations on January 8, 2017. The series has since returned to WNYW and its sister station, WWOR-TV.

The new revival features classic segments (such as the popular "Snake in a Can" game) alongside new show elements including "Wonder-mojis," "Cool Science" and "DJ Dance Emergency" featuring DJs Coco and Breezy, with "DJ Dance Emergency" being a revamp of "Wonderama A Go-Go" / "Disco City" from the classic show. Season 1 of the revival featured 16 episodes.

See alsoKids Are People Too'', created and initially hosted by Bob McAllister, 1978 to 1982 on ABC

External links

YouTube: Kids Are People Too (theme for Bob McAllister Wonderama) '70s TV
Metacafe Video of Ali vs. Frazier Marble championship
Sonny Fox's official website
Official Wonderama website (2016 revival)

References

1950s American children's television series
1960s American children's television series
1970s American children's television series
1980s American children's television series
2010s American children's television series
2020s American children's television series
1950s American variety television series
1960s American variety television series
1970s American variety television series
1980s American variety television series
2010s American variety television series
2020s American variety television series
1950s American children's game shows
1960s American children's game shows
1970s American children's game shows
1980s American children's game shows
2010s American children's game shows
1955 American television series debuts
1977 American television series endings
1980 American television series debuts
1987 American television series endings
2016 American television series debuts
American television series revived after cancellation
Black-and-white American television shows
Culture of New York City
English-language television shows
First-run syndicated television programs in the United States
Television series by Metromedia
Local children's television programming in the United States